Typhlomangelia fluctuosa is a species of sea snail, a marine gastropod mollusk in the family Borsoniidae.

Description

Distribution
This species occurs in the Southern Indian Ocean off the Kerguelen Islands.

References

 Watson R.B. 1881. Mollusca of H.M.S. 'Challenger' expedition -part 9. Journal of the Linnean Society, 15: 413–455.
 Powell A.W.B. (1960) Antarctic and Subantarctic Mollusca; Records of the Auckland Institute and Museum Vol. 5, No. 3/4

External links
   Bouchet P., Kantor Yu.I., Sysoev A. & Puillandre N. (2011) A new operational classification of the Conoidea. Journal of Molluscan Studies 77: 273-308

fluctuosa
Gastropods described in 1881